Austroaeschna atrata is a species of Australian dragonfly in the family Telephlebiidae, 
known as the mountain darner. 
It inhabits the upper reaches of mountain streams, generally above an altitude of 400m, in New South Wales and Victoria.

Austroaeschna atrata is a medium-sized to large dragonfly with a very dark colouring and dull markings.

Gallery

See also
 List of dragonflies of Australia

References

Telephlebiidae
Odonata of Australia
Endemic fauna of Australia
Taxa named by René Martin
Insects described in 1909